Begimai Karybekova (born 3 September 1998) is a Kyrgyz model and beauty pageant titleholder who was crowned Miss Kyrgyzstan 2017. She represented Kyrgyzstan at Miss Universe 2018, becoming the first Kyrgyz woman to compete in Miss Universe.

Life and career
Begimay Karybekova was born in Naryn, Kyrgyzstan. She is a student at the International University of Kyrgyzstan in Bishkek, also works as a model. Karybekova began her pageantry career after representing Kyrgyzstan at Miss Intercontinental 2016 and Top Model of the World, where she placed in the top seven in the latter competition. In 2017, she was crowned Miss Kyrgyzstan 2017 and was given the opportunity to represent Kyrgyzstan at Miss World 2017. However, she was forced to withdraw from the competition due to issues securing a Chinese visa. However, she also received the right to represent Kyrgyzstan at Miss Universe 2018 in Bangkok, Thailand, where she will become the first ever Kyrgyz entrant in the competition.

References 
 https://24.kg/english/136285__Kyrgyzstani_Begimai_Karybekova_becomes_model_of_Emporio_Armani_/amp/

External links
www.miss.kg
missuniverse.com

1998 births
Kyrgyzstani beauty pageant winners
Kyrgyzstani female models
Living people
Miss Universe 2018 contestants
People from Naryn